Thomas Seebohm (born William Thomas Mulvany Seebohm, July 7, 1934, Gleiwitz, Upper Silesia – August 25, 2014, Bonn, Germany) was a phenomenological philosopher whose wide-ranging interests included, among others, Immanuel Kant, Edmund Husserl, hermeneutics, and logic. Other areas of Professor Seebohm's interests included the history of philosophy, philosophy of history, philosophy of the formal sciences, methodology and philosophy of the human sciences, the history of 19th century British Empiricism, American pragmatism, analytic philosophy, philosophy of law and practical philosophy, and the development of the history of philosophy in Eastern Europe. Despite this diverse span of interests, Seebohm was chiefly known as a phenomenologist, who "above all...considered himself a creative phenomenologist, who as a critically reflecting philosopher would look at all major issues with which he became confronted, from a transcendental phenomenological point of view."

Biography
Seebohm was born in Gleiwitz, Upper-Silesia as son of the German minister of transport Hans-Christoph Seebohm and graduated high school in 1952 from the division of languages (later passing an additional exam in Classical Greek in 1956). He learned cabinetmaking after high school from 1952–1954, passing his journeyman's examination in March 1954 and began his academic career thereafter. His university studies were conducted at the universities of Hamburg, Bonn, Saarbrücken, and Mainz with focuses in philosophy, Slavic languages, Slavonic literature, and sociology. He earned his PhD summa cum laude in philosophy, Slavonic literature, and sociology from the University of Mainz in 1960 with the completion of his dissertation, Die Bedingungen der Möglichkeit der Transzendentalphilosophie: Edmund Husserls transcendental-phänomenologischer Ansatz, dargestellt im Anschluss an seine Kant-Kritik (The conditions of the possibility of transcendental philosophy: Edmund Husserl's transcendental-phenomenological assessment, presented in connection with his criticism of Kant), which was published later in 1962.

From 1960 to 1965 Seebohm was without a permanent teaching position, but survived on a fellowship and conducted research on "the history of medieval Russian philosophy and culture," the results of which would eventually be published in book form more than a decade later in 1977 as Ratio and Charisma. Starting points for the development of a philosophic and scientific understanding of the Russian cultural world of Moscow. In 1965, Seebohm secured his first position as a teacher of philosophy as an "assistant" at the University of Mainz, with his second appointment as a visiting professor at the Pennsylvania State University coming soon after in 1970. After a brief, year-long stint as a professor at the University of Trier in 1973, Seebohm became a full professor of philosophy at the Pennsylvania State University, a position he would retain from 1973 to 1984. In those years he served as a visiting professor at both The New School for Social Research in 1980 and the University of Heidelberg in 1981 before returning to his patria at the University of Mainz as Professor of Philosophy, succeeding a fellow phenomenologist, Gerhard Funke. Throughout his tenures as professor of philosophy, Seebohm had offered courses in German idealism, phenomenology, formal and formalized logic, and in hermeneutics.

In addition to this, Seebohm served as the chairman of the Philosophische Seminar, member of the board of directions for the Center for Advanced Research in Phenomenology, secretary of the Inner Circle of the Allgemeine Gesellschaft für Philosophie in Germany, an honorary member of the North American Kant Society, and a winner of the Ballard Prize from the Center for Advanced Research in Phenomenology for his book Hermeneutics, Method and Methodology. He also served terms as president of the Kant Gesellschaft and as editor of Kant Studien.

Chronological bibliography 
 "Lebenswelt", "Intersubjektivität", "Protention", "Quintilian", in: Philosophisches Wörterbuch, 16. Edition, Stuttgart: Kröner, 1961, pp. 279–80, 345–6, 479, 487.
 Die Bedingungen der Möglichkeit der Transzendentalphilosophie, Bonn: Bouvier, 1961, 200 p.
 "Beiträge zu Philosophie und Wissenschaft, ed. E Höfling", in: Archiv für Rechts- und Sozialphilosophie 48 (1962), pp. 265–9. (Review)
 "Wer ist ein Sohn des Vaterlandes?", A.N. Radiscev, In: Aufklärung, ed. G. Funke, Stuttgart: Koehler, 1963, pp. 363 – 9. (Translation).
 "Erkenntnis aus dem Buch der Natur und aus der Heiligen Schrift", M.W. Lomonossow, In: Aufklärung, ed. G. Funke, Stuttgart: Koehler, 1963, pp. 316 – 22. (Translation).
 "H. Drüe, Edmund Husserls System der phänomenologischen Psychologie", in: Zeitschrift für philosophische Forschung 18 (1963), pp. 523 – 31. (Review)
 "K. Löwith, Die Hegelsche Linke", in: 49 (1963), pp. 119–25. (Review)
 "St. Buczkowski, "Prawo a problemy ekonomiczne", W. Wolter, "Zroswazannad wina nie umyslna", A. Podgorecki. "Sociologia a nauki prawne", in: Panstwo i Prawo 17 (1962)", in:  49 (1963), pp. 360-5. (Review)
 "Zur Krise der Tradition unter Ivan III", in: Zeitschrift für slavische Philologie 32 (1965), pp. 108 – 123.
 "Hegel bei den Sklaven, ed. D. Tschyzevskij", in: Zeitschrift für Ostforschung 17 (1968), pp. 127 – 32. (Review)
 “Reflexion, Interpretation und Dialektik", in: Entwicklung und Fortschritt, Festschrift für W.E. Mühlmann, ed. H. Reimann and E.W. Müller, Tübingen: J.B.C. Mohr, 1969, pp. 63 – 74.
 "Bemerkngen zur Klosterreform Josef Sanins", in: Welt der Slaven 14 (1969), pp. 430 – 450.
 "Logik", in: Lexikon der Pädagogik, Vol. III, Freiburg: Herder, 1971, pp. 121 – 2.
 "Zwei neuere Explikate der Begriffe 'analytisch' und 'synthetisch'", in: Kantstudien 62 (1971), 202 - 217.
 "Der systematische Ort von Herders 'Metakritik'", in: Kantstudien 63 (1972), pp. 59 – 73.
 "Über die Möglichkeit konsequenzlogischer Kontrolle phenomenologischer Analysen", in: Kantstudien 63 (1972), pp. 237 – 246.
 Zur Kritik der hermeneutischen Vernunft, Bonn: Bouvier, 1972, 163 p.
 "Reflexion and Totality in the Phenomenology of Edmund Husserl", in: Journal of the British Society of Phenomenology 4 (1973), pp. 20 – 30.
 "Bemerkungen zu Pazanin und Strasser", in: Vérité et Vérification, Actes du Quatrieme Colloque International de Phénoménologie, Schwäbisch Hall, 8 - 11 septembre 1969, ed. H.L. Van Breda, Den Haag: Nijhoff, 1974, pp. 183 – 4.
 "Das Widerspruchsprinzip in der Kantischen Logik und der Hegelschen Dialektik", in: Akten des 4. Internationalen Kant-Kongresses Mainz, April 1974, Ed. G. Funke, Berlin: de Gruyter, 1974, pp. 862 – 74.
 "Zur Genese des Historismus", in: bewußt sein, Gerhard Funke zu eigen, ed. A Bucher, H. Drüe, Th.M. Seebohm, Bonn: Bouvier, 1975, pp. 111 – 24.
 bewußt sein, Gerhard Funke zu eigen, ed. A Bucher, H. Drüe, Th.M. Seebohm, Bonn: Bouvier, 1975, (co-editor).
 "The Grammar of Hegel's Dialectic", in: Hegel Studien 11 (1976), pp. 149 – 80.
 "Die Phänomenologie kognitiver Leistungen im Umgang mit formalen Sprachen", in: Phänomenologische Forschungen 2 (1976), pp. 49 – 75.
 "R. Sokolowski, Husserlian Meditations", in: Philosophische Rundschau 23 (1976), pp. 60 – 5. (Review)
 "G. Planty-Bonjour, Hegel et la pensée philosophique en Russie 1830 - 1917", in: Hegel Studien 11 (1976), pp. 313 – 6. (Review)
 Ratio und Charisma. Ansätze zur Ausbildung eines philosophischen und wissenschaftlichen Weltverständnisses im Moskauer Rußland, Bonn: Bouvier, 1977, 766 p.
 "Bemerkungen zum Problem der Interpretation irrealer Konditionalsätze als verkürzter Schlüsse", in: Kantstudien 68 (1977), pp. 1 – 17.
 "The Problem of Hermeneutics in Recent Anglo-American Literature, Part I", in: Philosophy and Rhethoric 10 (1977), pp. 180 – 98.
 "The Problem of Hermeneutics in Recent Anglo-American Literature, Part II", in: Philosophy and Rhethoric 10 (1977), pp. 263 – 75.
 "Wertfreies Urteilen über fremde Kulturen im Rahmen einer transzendental-phänomenologischen Axiologie", in: Phänomenologische Forschungen 4 (1977), pp. 52 – 85.
 "Reflection, Interpretation, and Dialectic", in: Graduate Faculty Journal 7 (1977), pp. 15 – 33.
 "A. Walicki, The Slavophile Controversy", in: Hegel Studien 12 (1977), pp. 258 – 61. (Review)
 "On the Doctrine of Categories", in: Categories: A Colloquium, ed. H.W. Johnstone, University Park, PA: Dept. of Philosophy, Penn State University Press, 1978, pp. 21 – 40.
 "H.G. Gadamer, Philosophical Hermeneutics", in: Philosophy and Rhethoric 11 (1978), pp. 191 – 5. (Review)
 "P. Ricoeur, Interpretation Theory: Discourse and the Surplus of Meaning", in: Graduate Faculty Philosophy Journal 7 (1978), pp. 257 – 69. (Review)
 "Schelling's Kantian Critique of Hegel's Deduction of Categories", in: Clio 8 (1979), pp. 239 – 55.
 "Sowjetrussische Veröffentlichungen zum Kant-Jahr 1974", in: Kantstudien 70 (1979), pp. 491 – 507.
 "A. Gulyga, Kant", in:Kantstudien 70 (1979), pp. 234 – 6. (Review)
 "Historische Kausalerklärung", in: Kausalität: Neue Texte, ed. G. Posch, Stuttgart: Philipp Reclam, 1981, pp. 260 – 88.
 "Kant's Theory of Revolution", in: Social Research: An International Quarterly of the Social Sciences 48 (1981), pp. 557 – 587.
 "Hegel, Gesammelte Werke, Vol. 11, ed. F. Hogemann and W. Jaeschke", in: Clio 11 (1981), pp. 440 –4. (Review)
 "The Significance of the Phenomenology of Written Discourse for Hermeneutics", in: Interpersonal Communication: Essays in Phenomenology and Hermeneutics, ed. J.J. Pilotta, Washington D.C.: Center of Advanced Research in Phenomenology and University Press of America, 1982, 141 - 59.
 "Die Kantische Beweistheorie und die Beweise der Kritik der reinen Vernunft", in: Akten des 5. internationalen Kant-Kongresses, Vol. II, ed. G. Funke, Bonn: Bouvier, 1982, pp. - 127 - 48.
 "The New Hermeneutics, other Trends, and the Human Sciences from the Standpoint of Transcendental Phenomenology", in: Continental Philosophy in America, ed. H.J. Silverman, J. Sallis, and Th.M. Seebohm, Pittsburgh: Duquesne University Press, 1983, pp. 64 – 89.
 Continental Philosophy in America, ed. H.J. Silverman, J. Sallis, Th.M. Seebohm, Pittsburgh: Duquesne University Press, 1983, (co-editor).
 "The Other in the Field of Consciousness", in: Aron Gurwitsch in Memoriam, ed. L.E. Embree, Washington D.C.: Center of Advanced Research in Phenomenology and University Press of America, 1984, pp. 283 – 304.
 "Preface, Bibliography, Index", in: Kant and Phenomenology, ed. Th.M. Seebohm and J.J.  Kockelmans, Washington D.C.: Center of Advanced Research in Phenomenology and University Press of America, 1984, pp. V - XII, 203 - 229.
 Philosophie der Logik. Handbuch Philosophie, Freiburg: Alber, 1984, 364 p.
 Kant and Phenomenology, Washington: Center for Advanced Research in Phenomenology and University Press of America, 1984. (Together with J.J. Kockelmans).
 "Boeckh and Dilthey: The Development of Methodical Hermeneutics", in: Man and World 17 (1984), pp. 325 – 46.
 "Die Begründung der Hermeneutik Diltheys in Husserls transzendentaler Phänomenologie", in: Dilthey und die Philosophie der Gegenwart, ed. E.W. Orth, Freiburg, München: Alber, 1985, pp. 97 – 1024.
 "The End of Philosophy: Three Historical Aphorisms", in: Hermeneutics and Deconstruction, ed. H.J. Silverman and D. Ihde, New York: New York University Press, 1985, pp. 10 – 23.
 "Die Stellung der phänomenologischen Idee der Letzbegründung zur Seinsfrage", in: Einheit als Grundlage der Philosophie, ed. K. Gloy and E. Rudolph, Darmstadt: Wissenschaftliche Buchgesellschaft, 1985, pp. 303 – 21.
 "Fichte's and Husserl's Critique of Kant's Transcendental Deduction", in: Husserl Studies 2 (1985), 53 - 74.
 "Facts, Words, and what Jurisprudence Can Teach Hermeneutics", in: Research in Phenomenology 16 (1986), pp. 24 – 40.
 "Isiodor of Seville versus Aristotle in the Questions on Human Law and Right in the Summa Theologiae of Thomas of Aquinas", in: Graduate Faculty Journal 11 (1986), pp. 83 – 106.
 "Deconstruction in the Framework of Methodical Hermeneutics", in: Journal of the British Society of Phenomenology 17 (1986), pp. 275 – 88.
 "Phänomenologischen Betrachtungen zur Semantik möglicher Welten", in: Johannes Gutenberg Universität, Antrittsvorlesungen, Vol. 2, Mainz: Universitätspressestelle, 1987, pp. 67 – 102.
 "Wissenschaftsbegründung und Letztbegründung im Denkweg Martin Heideggers", in: Zur Selbstbegründung der Philosophie seit Kant, ed. W. Marx, Frankfurt: Klostermann, 1987, pp. 157 – 75.
 "Dilthey, Husserl, and Prima Philosophia", in: Dilthey and Phenomenology, ed. R.A. Makkreel and J. Scanlon, Washington D.C.: Center of Advanced Research in Phenomenology and University Press of America, 1987, pp. 23 – 29.
 "Considerations of a Husserlian"; In: Pragmatism Considers Phenomenology, ed. R.S. Corrington, C. Hausman, and Th.M. Seebohm, Washington D.C.: Center of Advanced Research in Phenomenology and University Press of America, 1987, pp. 217 – 229.
 "Foreword", in: G. Funke, Phenomenology, Metaphysics, or Method, Athens, Ohio, London: Ohio University Press, 1987, pp. VII - XV.
 Pragmatism Considers Phenomenology, ed. R.S. Corrington, C. Hausman, and Th.M. Seebohm, Washington D.C.: Center of Advanced Research in Phenomenology and University Press of America, 1987, (co-editor).
 "Über die unmögliche Möglichkeit andere Kategorien zu denken als die unseren", in: Kants transzendentale Deduktion und die Möglichkeit von Transzendentalphilosophie, ed. Forum für Philosophie, Bad Homburg, Frankfurt: Suhrkamp, 1988, pp. 11 – 31.
 Perspektiven Transzendentaler Reflektion, Festschrift für Gerhard Funke zum 75. Geburtstag, Bonn: Bouvier, 1988. (Together with Gisela Müller).
 "Phenomenology of Logic and the Problem of Modalizing", in: Journal of the British Society of Phenomenology 19 (1988), pp. 235 – 251.
 "Über das Problem der Beschreibung einander bedingender Ereignisse", in: Philosophie und Psychologie, Leib und Seele - Determination und Vorhersage, ed. W. Marx, Frankfurt: Klostermann, 1989, 133- 163.
 "Bemerkungen zu einem Schriftenverzeichnis", in: Perspektiven transzendentaler Reflexion, Festschrift für Gerhard Funke zum 75. Geburtstag, ed. G. Müller and Th.M. Seebohm, Bonn: Bouvier, 1989, pp. 205 – 219.
 "Kant's Theory of Revolution", in: The Public Realm, ed. R. Schürmann, Albany: State University of New York Press, 1989, 60 - 81.
 "Apodiktizität, Recht und Grenze", in: Husserl Symposion Mainz, ed. G. Funke, Akademie der Wissenschaften und der Literatur Mainz, Stuttgart: Steiner, 1989, pp. 65 – 99.
 "Transzendental Phenomenology", in: Husserl's Phenomenology: A Textbook, ed. J.N. Mohanty and W.R. McKenna, Washington D.C.: Center of Advanced Research in Phenomenology, Inc. and co-published by arrangement with the University Press of America, Inc., 1989, 345 - 385.
 "The More Dangerous Disease: Transzendental Psychologism, Anthropologism and Historism", in: Perspectives on Psychologism, ed. M.A. Notturno, Leiden: E.J. Brill, 1989, pp. 11 – 31.
 Proceedings of the 6. International Kant Congress, Vol. I, II/1, II/2, ed. G. Funke and Th.M. Seebohm, Washington D.C.: Center of Advanced Research in Phenomenology and University Press of America, 1989, (co-editor).
 "Perspektiven des Lingualismus, Heidegger und Quine", in: Martin Heidegger weiterdenken, ed. A. Raffelt, Schriftenreihe der katholischen Akademie der Erzdiözese Freiburg, München, Zürich: Schell & Steiner, 1990, pp. 9 – 35.
 "Vorwort des Herausgebers", in: Aron Gurwitsch, Kants Theorie des Verstandes, ed. Th.M. Seebohm, Contributions to Phenomenology 5, Dordrecht: Kluwer Academic Publishers, 1990, V - XX.
 Aron Gurwitsch, Kants Theorie des Verstandes, Contributions to Phenomenology Vol. 5, Dordrecht, Boston, London: Kluwer Academic Publishers, 1990.
 "Kategoriale Anschauung", in: Phänomenologische Forschungen 23 (1990), pp. 9 – 43.
 "Psychologism Revisited", in: Phenomenology and the Formal Sciences, ed. Th.M. Seebohm, D. Føllesdal and J.N. Mohanty Contributions to Phenomenology Vol. 8, Dordrecht: Kluwer Academic Publishers, 1991, pp. 149 – 182.
 Elementare formalisierte Logik, Freiburg: Alber, 1991, 263 p.
 Phenomenology and the Formal Sciences, Contributions to Phenomenology Vol. 8, Dordrecht: Kluwer Academic Publishers, 1991. (Together with Dagfinn Føllesdal and J.N. Mohanty).
 Prinzip und Applikation in der praktischen Philosophie, AdWL Mainz, Stuttgart: Steiner, 1991.
 "The Paradox of Subjectivity and the Idea of Ultimate Grounding in Husserl and Heidegger", in: Phenomenology and Indian Philosophy, ed. D.P. Chattopadhyaya, L. Embree and J.N. Mohanty, New Delhi: Motilal Barnasidass Publishers, 1992, pp. 153 – 168.
 "Falsehood as the Prime Mover of Hermeneutics", in: The Journal of Speculative Philosophy NS 6 (1992), pp. 1 – 24.
 "Variable, Objekte, Mengen von Universen und maximale Konsistenz in formalisierten Sprachen" (Metakritik zur Diskussion von L.B. Puntel), in: Ethik und Sozialwissenschaften, Streitforum für Erwägungskultur 3 (1992), pp. 186 – 195.
 "The Pre-conscious, the Unconscious, and the Subconscious: A Phenomenological Explication", in: Man and World 25 (1992), pp. 505 – 520.
 "The Pre-conscious, the Unconscious, and the Subconscious: A Phenomenological Critique of the Hermeneutics of the Latent", in: Aquinas. Rivista Internazionale di Filosofia 35 (1992), pp. 47 – 271. (Extended version of 26)
 "Possible Worlds", in: Phenomenology - East and West (Festschrift Mohanty), ed. F.M. Kirkland and D.P. Chattopadhyaya, Dordrecht: Kluwer Academic Publishers, 1993.
 "Über die vierfache Abwesenheit im Jetzt. Warum ist Husserl da, wo ihn Derrida nicht vermutet?", in: Das Rätsel der Zeit, Philosophische Analysen, ed. H.M. Baumgartner, Freiburg: Alber, 1993.
 "L'Individuo. Considerazioni fenomenologiche su una categoria logica", in: Discipline Filosofiche (1993.1), pp. 21 – 71.
 "Logika ponjatii kak predosylka kantovsoj formal'noj i transcedental'noj logiki" (translated by V. Brijuschinkin), in: Kantovskij Sbornik 17 (1993).
 "Intentionalität und passive Synthesis", in: Husserl in Halle, ed. H.M. Gerlach and H.M. Sepp, Daedalus V, Frankfurt, Berlin et al.: Peter Lang, 1994.
 "Considerations on Der Satz vom Grund", in: The Question of Hermeneutics, ed. T.J. Stapleton, Dordrecht: Kluwer Academic Publishers, 1994.
 "Fichte's Discovery of the Dialectical Method", in: Fichte, Historical Contexts/Contemporary Controversies, ed. D. Breazeale and T. Rockmore, New Jersey: Humanities Press, 1994.
 "Kant und die Revolution", in: Jahrbuch der Albertus-Universität zu Königsberg, XXVIII, 1993, pp. 141 – 148.
 "The Apodicticity of Absence", in: Derrida and Phenomenology, ed. W.R. McKenna and J.C. Evans, Dordrecht: Kluwer Academic Publishers, 1995.
 "Some Difficulties in Kant's Conception of Formal Logic", in: Proceedings of the 8. International Kant Congress, Memphis 1995, Vol. I, Part 1, Section 1–2, ed. H. Robinson, Milwaukee: Marquette University Press, 1995.
 "Literary Tradition, Intercultural Transfer and Cross-Cultural Conversations", in: Cross-Culturall Conversations (Initiation), ed. A.N. Balslev, American Academy of Religion, Cultural Criticism Series Nr. 5, Atlanta, Georgia: Scholars Press, 1996, pp. 145 – 172.
 "Kant und Mill über den Ursprung des obersten Prinzipes der Moral", in: Inmitten der Zeit. Beiträge zur Europäische Gegenwartsphilosophie (Festschrift für Mafred Riedel), ed. Th. Grethlein and H. Leitner, Königshausen und Neumann, 1996, pp. 179 – 217.
 „Elfriede Conrad, Kants Logikvorlesungen als neuer Schlüssel  zur Architektonik der Kritik der reinen Vernunft. Forschungen und Materialien zur Deutschen Aufklärung. Stuttgart/Bad Cannstatt: Frommann-Holzboog, 1994“ in Journal of the History of Philosophy 1996, pp. 620 – 21. (Review)
 "Individuals, Identity, and Names: Phenomenological Considerations", in: Husserl in Contemporary Context, ed. B.C. Hopkins, Dordrecht: Kluwer Academic Publishers, 1997, pp. 115 – 150.
 "Johann Gottlieb Fichte", in: Encyclopedia of Phenomenology, ed. L. Embree et al., Dordrecht: Kluwer Academic Publishers, 1997, pp. 223 – 226.
 "Germany" (together with E.W. Orth), in: Encyclopedia of Phenomenology, ed. L. Embree et al., Dordrecht: Kluwer Academic Publishers, 1997, pp. 270 – 276.
 "Hermeneutics", in: Encyclopedia of Phenomenology, ed. L. Embree et al., Dordrecht: Kluwer Academic Publishers, 1997, pp. 308 – 312.
 "Logic", in: Encyclopedia of Phenomenology, ed. L. Embree et al., Dordrecht: Kluwer Academic Publishers, 1997, pp. 421 – 425.
 “Vorwort” in: Gisela Müller, Wahrnehmung, Urteil und Erkenntniswille. Untersuchungen zu Husserls Phänomenologie der vorprädikativen Erfahrung, Bouvier, Bonn, 1999, pp. 5 – 19
 “Die reine Logik, die systematische Konstruktion des Prinzips der Vernunft und das System der Ideen” in: Architektonik und System in der Philosophie Kants, ed. H.F. Fulda / J. Stolzenberg, Meiner, Hamburg 2001, pp. 204 – 231.
 “The Methodology of Hermeneutics as a Challenge for Phenomenological Research” in: The Reach of Reflection” in: Issues for Phenomenology´s Second Century, ed. S. Crowell, L. Embree, and S.J. Julian, www.electronpress.com, 2001, pp. 200 – 226.
 (T.M. Zeboms), “Parvertejot psihologimu” transl. from the English (Bibl. Nr.) by E. Picukane, in: Kentaurs XXI, Riga, 2001, pp. 23 – 50.
 “The Phenomenological Movement: A Tradition without Method? Merleau-Ponty and Husserl” in: Merleau-Ponty´s Reading of Husserl, Ed. T. Toadvine and L. Embree, Kluwer Academic Publishers, Dordrecht / Boston / London 2002, pp. 51 – 68.
 “The Hermeneutics of Texts. The Second Canon” in: Hermeneutic Philosophy of Science, Van Gogh´s Eyes, and God, ed. B. E. Babich, Boston Studies in the Philosophy of Science 225, Kluwer Academic Publishers, Dordrecht / Boston / London 2002, pp. 137 – 152.
 “Zum Problem des Verstehens” in: Die Stellung des Menschen in der Kultur, ed. C. Bermes, J. Jonas, K.-H Lembeck, Königshausen und Neumann, Würzburg 2002, pp. 123 – 143.
 Hermeneutics, Method and Methodology, Contributions to Phenomenology Vol. 50; Dordrecht / Boston / London, Kluwer Academic Publishers, 2004.
 “Three Responses” in: International Journal of Philosophical Studies vol.15, #5, 2008. pp 755–767
 “Naturalism, Historism, and Phenomenology“ in: Advancing Phenomenology; Essays in Honour of Lester Embree ed. Th. Nenon, P. Blosser, Springer, Dordrecht 2010, pp 7 – 34
 “ “Husserl on the Human Sciences in Ideen II” in: Husserl’ s Ideen, ed. L. Embree and T. Nednon, Springer, Dordrecht 2013, pp. 125–140.
 “Kants Theorie einer eigentlich rationalen Naturwissenschaft und die „Revolotionen“ der Mathematik und der Physik im 19. und 20. Jahrhundert“ in: Das Leben der Vernunft. Beiträge zur Philosophie Kants, ed. D. Hüning, S. Klingner, C. Olk, De Gruyter, Berlin 2013, pp. 189–207.

References

1934 births
2014 deaths
German philosophers
Pennsylvania State University faculty
People from Gliwice
Academic staff of Heidelberg University
Academic staff of Johannes Gutenberg University Mainz